Jon Prescott (born August 10, 1981) is an American actor.

Early life 
He was born in Mountain View, California, but raised near Portland, Oregon. Prescott has two brothers, and a sister. He attended Emerson College in Boston. After college he moved to Los Angeles.

Career 
He hosted OLN's Outdoor Investigations and has also been seen on television in 30 Rock,  Rescue Me, CSI: New York, As the World Turns, Watch Over Me, Law & Order, Las Vegas, One Life to Live, Hot Properties, The 1/2 Hour News Hour, Celebrity Apprentice, and the HBO pilot Suburban Shootout.  His films include Howl and The Holiday.

Prescott had a recurring role as Mark Flemming on the first season of the Lifetime TV series The Client List in 2012.

In 2012 and 2013, Prescott appeared in ads for Gevalia Kaffe as "Johan", a handsome Swedish spokesman who has an irresistible effect on women.

TV series

Film

References

External links
 Official Website

1981 births
Living people
Male models from California
American male television actors
Emerson College alumni